Matteo Sellas (sometimes also written Mateo Sellas or in original German Matthäus Seelos) was a German luthier born in 1580 in Füssen who worked in Venice from 1620–1650 and is best known for building lutes, archlutes and baroque guitars.

References 

German luthiers
1580 births
People from Füssen
1661 deaths
Italian luthiers
Businesspeople from Venice
Emigrants from the Holy Roman Empire to the Republic of Venice